Mitsuo Hashimoto may refer to:
Mitsuo Hashimoto (manga artist) (born 1955), Japanese manga artist
Mitsuo Hashimoto (director), Japanese animation director
Mitsuo Hashimoto, the real name of Kinpei Azusa (1931–1997), Japanese voice actor